Maggie Gee (August 5, 1923February 1, 2013) was an American aviator who served in the Women Airforce Service Pilots (WASP) in World War II. She was one of two Chinese-American women to serve in the organization, the other being Hazel Ying Lee. As a WASP pilot, she helped male pilots train for combat, as female pilots were not allowed to serve in combat at that time. She also ferried military aircraft.

Life
Gee, one of six children, was born in Berkeley, California, August 5, 1923. She was a third-generation Chinese American; her maternal grandparents had moved to California from a village in Guangdong. Her grandfather was a pioneer in the abalone industry on the Monterey Peninsula.

In 1941, Gee enrolled at the University of California, Berkeley to study physics, but dropped out after a few months to work in the drafting department at the Mare Island Naval Shipyard, following the United States' entering World War II. Her mother Jung An Yoke also worked there, as a welder.

She later worked at the Lawrence Livermore National Laboratory. Gee also served for many decades as an elected member of the Alameda County Democratic Central Committee, supporting voter registration and fundraising.  She also served for many years as a long-time Board member and Treasurer of the Berkeley Democratic Club in Berkeley, California. She has served on the California Democratic Party Executive Board and Asian Pacific Islander Democratic Caucus.

Awards and recognition
She is featured in a number of books, oral history projects, and documentaries. In 2009, a book was published  about her life story called Sky High: The True Story of Maggie Gee, by Marissa Moss. In 2010, she and all other living WASP pilots received the Congressional Gold Medal.

She has received numerous awards and citations from the Democratic Party, including a posthumous award in March 2014 from the Asian Pacific Democratic Caucus of Alameda County.

References

External links
 Video of an interview with Maggie Gee about WWII via Youtube
 Video of an interview with Maggie Gee about "Sky High" a children's book about the life of Maggie Gee via Youtube

1923 births
2013 deaths
Aviators from California
Women Airforce Service Pilots personnel
People from Berkeley, California
American aviators of Chinese descent
21st-century American women
Military personnel from California